The 1971 Uganda National First Division League was the fourth season of the Ugandan football championship, the top-level football league of Uganda.

Overview
The 1971 Uganda National First Division League was contested by 8 teams and was won by Simba FC, the Army side.  In the next two seasons of 1972 and 1973 the championship was not completed because of civil unrest.

League standings

Leading goalscorer
The top goalscorer in the 1971 season was Polly Ouma of Simba FC with 18 goals.

References

External links
 Uganda - List of Champions - RSSSF (Hans Schöggl)
 Ugandan Football League Tables - League321.com

Ugandan Super League seasons
Uganda
Uganda
Football